The Seychelles national beach soccer team represents Seychelles in beach soccer. It is controlled by the Seychelles football association. Seychelles will participate in the FIFA Beach Soccer World Cup for the very first time in 2025 where they will make their debut as host.

Competitive record

Africa Beach Soccer Cup of Nations record

World Cup record

B